Anduelo Amoeferie (born 24 September 1991) is a Surinamese professional footballer who plays as a full-back for SVB Eerste Divisie club Inter Moengotapoe and the Suriname national team.

International career 
Amoeferie made his international debut for Suriname in a 1–0 friendly victory over Guyana on 30 April 2015.

In June 2021 Amoeferie was named to the Suriname squad for the 2021 CONCACAF Gold Cup.

Honours 
Inter Moengotapoe

SVB Eerste Divisie: 2012–13, 2013–14, 2014–15, 2015–16, 2016–17, 2018–19
 SVB Cup: 2011–12, 2016–17, 2018–19
 Suriname President's Cup: 2012, 2013, 2017, 2019
Caribbean Club Shield runner-up: 2018

References

External links 
 

1991 births
Living people
Surinamese footballers
Sportspeople from Paramaribo
Association football defenders
Association football fullbacks
SVB Eerste Divisie players
Inter Moengotapoe players
Suriname international footballers
2021 CONCACAF Gold Cup players